The Cheng Yu-tung Family refers to a wealthy Hong Kong-based family best known for controlling Chow Tai Fook, via which it also owns New World Development and Rosewood Hotel Group, among other businesses.

The businesses are currently being led by Adrian Cheng, the third-generation, and has been called by Citigroup research as being "brave and innovative" among other scions in Hong Kong.

Notable family members 

 Cheng Yu-tung (1925–2018); founder of Chow Tai Fook
 Henry Cheng (b. 1946); chairman of New World Development
 Adrian Cheng (b. 1979); CEO of New World Development
 Sonia Cheng (b. 1980); CEO of Rosewood Hotel Group
Brian Cheng (b. 1982)
Christopher Cheng (b. 1989)
Peter Cheng (b. 1952)
Conroy Cheng (b. 1977)
Conrad Cheng (b. 1979)

Charity 
Since 2019, New World has been involved in donating land to build public housing in Hong Kong.

Businesses 

 Chow Tai Fook
New World Development
NWS Holdings
 Rosewood Hotel Group (parent company of Rosewood Hotels & Resorts)

References 

Families of Hong Kong